Matthias Hahn (born 10 January 1965) is a German handball player. He competed at the 1988 Summer Olympics and the 1992 Summer Olympics.

References

External links
 

1965 births
Living people
German male handball players
Olympic handball players of East Germany
Olympic handball players of Germany
Handball players at the 1988 Summer Olympics
Handball players at the 1992 Summer Olympics
Sportspeople from Rostock